The tourism industry in Lebanon has been important to the local economy historically and to this day comprises a major source of revenue for the country. Before the Lebanese Civil War, Beirut was widely regarded as "The Paris of the Middle East" or also "The Pearl of the Middle East" often cited as a financial and business hub where visitors could experience Levantine Mediterranean culture, cuisine, history, archaeology, and architecture of Lebanon.

From Stone Age settlements to Phoenician city-states, from Roman temples to rock-cut hermitages, from Crusader Castles to Mamluk mosques and Ottoman hammams, the country's historical and archaeological sites are displayed all across the country, reflecting thousands of years of world history. In addition to physical attractions, Lebanon has a long-standing history of cultural tourism. Outsider interest in Lebanese and Levantine culture was especially stirred following the visits of many European orientalists, scholars, and poets, particularly Alphonse de Lamartine, Ernest Renan, and Victor Guérin.

Lebanon's diverse atmosphere and ancient history make it an important destination, and the country is slowly rebuilding itself after continued turmoil. Lebanon offers plenty: from ancient Roman ruins, to well-preserved castles, limestone caves, historic Churches and Mosques, beautiful beaches nestled in the Mediterranean Sea, world-renowned Lebanese cuisine, nonstop nightlife and discothèques, to mountainous ski resorts.

Significant private investment is currently being made in the modernization and expansion of the tourism sector, such as in hotels catering to international travelers. Casino du Liban, which historically constituted a major tourist destination, reopened in 1996. The largest ski resort in the country has been expanded and modernized. The Government believes that, because of the return of peace and stability to the country following the civil war, and with the development of the necessary infrastructure, tourism will again contribute significantly to Lebanon's economy. Lebanon's tourism industry also relies on the large number of Lebanese living abroad, who return regularly to the country during the summer season.

Citadels and Forts 

 Mseilha Fort is a medieval fortification situated north of the city of Batroun in Lebanon. The current fort was built by Emir Fakhreddine II in the 17th century to guard the route from Tripoli to Beirut. The fort is built on a long, narrow limestone rock near the Nahr el-Jawz River. Its walls are constructed with small sandstone blocks quarried from the nearby coast and built onto the edge of the limestone rock. The thickness of the walls ranges from 1.5 to 2 meters (4 to 6.5 feet). The larger limestone blocks are the only remains of an earlier structure probably built for the same defensive reason. The fort is approached through a narrow path and small stairway cut into the northern side of the bedrock. A small platform precedes the low arched main gate, secured by two loopholes and a small opening in the ceiling above the entrance. The main gate leads to a vaulted vestibule, followed by a narrow triangular courtyard, giving access to a small one meter (3 feet) wide passageway leading to the archery room of the west tower. The more elevated part of the fort is accessed through the east side of the main courtyard. A doorway leading to a hall, followed by three vaulted rooms, gives access to the eastern tower.

 Citadel of Raymond de Saint-Gilles, also known as Qala'at Sanjil in Arabic, is a citadel and fort in Tripoli, Lebanon. It takes its name from Raymond de Saint-Gilles, the Count of Toulouse and Crusader commander who started its construction on a hilltop outside Tripoli in 1103 in order to lay siege to the city. Later, Raymond enlarged the fortress, which he named Mont Peregrinus (Mt Pilgrim). The original castle was burnt down in 1289, and rebuilt again on numerous occasions and was rebuilt in 1307-08 by Emir Essendemir Kurgi. Later the citadel was rebuilt in part by the Ottoman Empire which can be seen today, with its massive Ottoman gateway, over which is an engraving from Süleyman the Magnificent who had ordered the restoration. In the early 19th century, the Citadel was extensively restored by the Ottoman Governor of Tripoli Mustafa Agha Barbar.

 Sidon Sea Castle is a crusader castle and one of the most prominent sites in the southern city of Sidon. During the 13th century, the Crusaders built Sidon's Sea Castle as a fortress on a small island connected to the mainland by a narrow 80m long roadway. The island was formerly the site of a temple to Melkart, the Phoenician version of Hercules. The beauty of the Castle can be seen in old illustrations of it; however, after bearing several wars, it has been damaged and renovated several times. It was partially destroyed by the Mamluks when they took over the city from the Crusaders, but they subsequently rebuilt it and added the long causeway. The castle later fell into disuse, but was again restored in the 17th century by Emir Fakhreddine II, only to suffer great damage. Today the castle consists primarily of two towers connected by a wall. In the outer walls, Roman columns were used as horizontal reinforcements, a feature often seen in fortifications built on or near former Roman sites. The rectangular west tower to the left of the entrance is the better preserved of the two. There is a large vaulted room scattered with old carved capitals and rusting cannonballs. A winding staircase leads up to the roof, where there is a small, domed Ottoman-era mosque. From the roof there is a great view across the old city and fishing harbor. The east tower isn't as well preserved and was built in two phases; the lower part dates to the Crusader period, while the upper level was built by the Mamluks. There has also been evidence of the old Phoenician city being buried under the sea in the area surrounding the castle, structures of walls, columns, stairways, remains of buildings, statues and cisterns.

 Moussa Castle is a castle between Deir el Qamar and Beit ed-Dine in Lebanon. It was built single-handedly by Moussa Abdel Karim Al-Maamari (born on July 27, 1931), a Lebanese visionary. It is the work of his life. He needed 60 years (21900 days and 394200 hours) of work. According to his biography, as a student, Moussa has always dreamed of building such a castle, and used to doodle his dream on pieces of paper in class. Moussa was not a very sharp student and his teacher Anwar used to make fun of him and tell him: "You'll never accomplish anything." Moussa's crush, a Lebanese girl, used to say that she wants to marry a guy who owns a palace. Between 1951 and 1962, he prepared everything to fulfill his plan, including buying the land and paperwork. In 1962, his work of life started: He built the castle and handcrafted each of its stones and clay animated figures representing different scenes of the old Lebanese village life of the 19th century, making it a true work of a visionary and a masterpiece by all means.

 Byblos Castle is a medieval castle in the town of Byblos, Lebanon. Originally a Phoenician stronghold, the castle was built over a white limestone cliff along the Mediterranean coastline of the town. It was built by the Crusaders in the 12th century from indigenous limestone and the remains of Roman structures. The finished structure was surrounded by a moat. Saladin captured the town and castle in 1188 and dismantled the walls in 1190. Later, the Crusaders recaptured Byblos and rebuilt the fortifications of the castle in 1197. In 1369, the castle had to fend off an attack from Cypriot vessels from Famagusta. The Byblos Castle has distinguished historical buildings for neighbors. Near it stand a few Egyptian temples, Phoenician Royal Necropolis and the Roman amphitheater. These are testament to the varied and rich history of the town of Byblos.
 Beaufort Castle is a Crusader fortress in Nabatieh Governorate, Southern Lebanon, about 1 kilometer (0.62 mi) to the south-south-east of the village of Arnoun. There was a fortification on the site before it was captured by Fulk, King of Jerusalem, in 1139 and construction of the Crusader castle probably began soon after. Saladin captured Beaufort in 1190, and 60 years returned to Crusader control. In 1268 Sultan Baibars captured the castle. The castle was named "bel fort" or "beau fort" (French for "beautiful fortress") by the Crusaders who occupied the castle in the 12th century. Its Arabic name Qala'at al-Shaqif means Castle of the High Rock (shqif is the Aramaic word for "high rock"). Beaufort provides one of the few cases where a medieval castle proved of military value and utility also in modern warfare, as its late 20th-century history shows. In the 17th century Fakhr-al-Din II took the castle as a part of his network of fortifications. Fakhr-al-Din II was defeated by the Ottomans, who destroyed the upper portions of the castle. The area was ruled by feudal families until 1769. In 1782 the Governor of Acre besieged the castle, captured it and destroyed many of its remaining fortifications. The Galilee earthquake of 1837 caused further damage to the structure and from then on the ruins were used as a quarry and a shelter for sheep. In the 17th century, Fakhr-al-Din II took the castle as a part of his network of fortifications. Fakhr-al-Din II was defeated by the Ottomans, who destroyed the upper portions of the castle. The area was ruled by feudal families until 1769. In 1782 the Governor of Acre besieged the castle, captured it and destroyed many of its remaining fortifications. The Galilee earthquake of 1837 caused further damage to the structure and from then on the ruins were used as a quarry and a shelter for sheep. The outcrop Beaufort occupied overlooks the Litani River. The river flows past the east side of the castle, which stands atop a 300 meters (980 ft) cliff which declines steeply to the river.

Old towns

Old towns still form the center or core of many Lebanese cities and towns. The majority of these old towns dot the coastline of Lebanon, with only a small number of them found in the country's interior. This reflects the nature of the Lebanese people who were a maritime culture largely involved in trade and commerce.

Tripoli is the second largest city in Lebanon and is the capital of the North Governorate. Dating back to the 14th century BCE, the city was the center of a Phoenician confederation between Tyre, Sidon and Arados, hence the name "Tripoli" meaning "Triple City" in Greek. It was the capital of the last Crusader state in the Levant the County of Tripoli in the 12th century. Tripoli continues to be the second largest city, after Cairo, in Mamluk architecture. Tripoli was a major trading Port city between Europe on one hand, and Aleppo & Damascus on another. The old town of Tripoli is home to numerous historical sites like the Citadel of Raymond de Saint-Gilles, Taynal Mosque, Mansouri Great Mosque and several other Hammams, Madrasas, and caravanserais. All of which are present inside the Souks of Tripoli, an expansive maze of Sandstone alleyways and narrow streets in compact urban forms. The Old City is decorated with elaborate ornaments, Arabesque designs, hexagonal cornices, molded door and window frames, and many other beautifying features. Elegant facades with decorative effects on elevations and around openings mark the entrances to old prayer halls, galleries, and courtyards. Simple cupolas or ribbed domes can be found over conspicuous and important spaces like tomb chambers, mihrab, and covered courtyards. Muqarnas and inscriptions, honeycomb moldings, and fishscale models decorate the minarets, portals, window exteriors, mihrab, qiblah wall... etc.
Batroun is a coastal city in Lebanon and the capital of the Batroun District in the North Governorate. The name Batroun derives from the Greek, Botrys (also spelled Bothrys), which was later Latinized to Botrus. Historians believe that the Greek name of the town originates from the Phoenician word, bater, which means to cut and it refers to the maritime wall that the Phoenicians built in the sea to protect them from tsunami. Other historians believe that the name of the town is derivative of the Phoenician words, "beit truna", which translates to house of the chief. The Phoenicians founded Batroun on the southern side of the promontory called in Antiquity, Theoprosopon and during the Byzantine Empire, Cape Lithoprosopon. Batroun is said to have been founded by Ithobaal I (Ethbaal), king of Tyre, whose daughter Jezabel married Ahab. The city belonged under Roman rule to Phoenicia Prima province, and later after the region was Christianized became a suffragan of the Patriarchate of Antioch. In the 551 Beirut earthquake, Batroun was destroyed, and mudslides and cracks occurred at the Cape Lithoprosopon. Historians believe that Batroun's large natural harbor was formed during the earthquake. One of Batroun's medieval archaeological sites is the Crusader citadel of Mousaylaha which is constructed on an isolated massive rock with steep sides protruding in the middle of a plain surrounded by mountains. Under Ottoman rule, Batroun was the center of a caza in the mutessariflik of Lebanon and the seat of a Maronite diocese, suffragan to the Maronite patriarchate. Since 1999 it has been the seat of the Maronite eparchy. Today, Batroun is composed of an old town with numerous old stone churches and winding alleyways, all assembled around the old Phoenician harbor.
Deir el Qamar is a village in south-central Lebanon, five kilometers outside of Beiteddine, consisting of stone houses with red-tiled roofs. During the 16th to 18th centuries, Deir el Qamar was the residence of the governors of Lebanon. It is also notable for its 15th-century Fakhredine Mosque, Fakhreddine II Palace, and other historical palaces and administrative buildings. The 17th century Deir el Qamar Synagogue is also in the village, although closed to the public. During its peak, the city was the center of Lebanese literary tradition. It was the first village in Lebanon to have a municipality in 1864, and it is the birthplace of many well-known personalities, such as artists, writers, and politicians. It was the capital of the Druze Cancimat of Lebanon (1840-1860). One of the most important historical and religious sites in Deir El Qamar is Our Lady of the Hill known as Saydet El Talle. This Maronite church goes back to the 15th century. The legend says that there was a Druze Emir in Baakline looking at the hill of Deir El Kamar. He saw a light coming out of the hill. He gathered his soldiers and ordered them to go in the morning and dig in the land. He said to them: 'If you find an Islamic symbol, build a mosque. If you find a Christian symbol, build a church." The soldiers went in the morning, dug in the land and found a rock with a cross on it. Under the cross, there was the moon and Venus. That was the sign that long time ago, there was a temple dedicated to the moon and Venus and later it became a church. Earthquakes and wars might be the reason for its disappearance." The rock discovered by the soldiers can be found above the old gate of the church. A Byzantine column can be found inside the church.
Zahleh is the capital and largest city of the Bekaa Governorate in east Lebanon. It is situated 55 km (34 mi) east of the capital Beirut, close to the Beirut-Damascus road, and lies at the junction of Mount Lebanon and the Beqaa valley, at a mean elevation of 1000 m. Zahlé is known as the "Bride of the Beqaa" and "the Neighbor of the Gorge" due to its geographical location and attractiveness, but also as "the City of Wine and Poetry"  It is famous throughout Lebanon and the region for its pleasant climate, numerous riverside restaurants and quality arak. Its inhabitants are predominantly Greek Catholic and known as Zahlawi. Zahlé is built upon a series of foothills of the Lebanon mountains, with Mount Sannine towering above it at a height of 2,628 meters (8,622 feet). Zahlé was founded in the early 18th century, in an area whose past reaches back some five millennia. It enjoyed a brief period as the region's first independent state in the 19th century when it had its own flag and anthem. Due to its relative geographic isolation from the local centers of power in Mount Lebanon and Syria, the town did not have any significant allies in the region to fall back on in case of conflicts or attacks. Zahlé was burned in 1777 and 1791, and it was burned again and plundered in 1860 during a conflict between the Christian population of the town and the Druze of the neighboring areas. The construction of the railroad line between Beirut and Damascus in 1885 brought prosperity to Zahlé, which became a freight hub on the trade route between Lebanon, Syria and Iraq, while continuing to serve as a regional agricultural center. The town is a vast collection of white-limestone houses covered with red-tiled-roofs. It houses several Ottoman-era buildings, several old churches, the Our Lady of Bekaa shrine, and a large saray. However, the most important attraction in Zahleh remains a 300 m (984 ft) promenade along a local river.  Sheltered between the ravine's limestone cliffs, it is lined up with outdoor restaurants, cafes and playrooms, and shaded by trees.
Sidon is the third largest city in Lebanon and the capital of the South Governorate. It lies on the Mediterranean sea, 40 km north of Tyre and 40 km south of the capital Beirut. Sidon has been inhabited since very early in prehistory. It was one of the most important Phoenician cities and may also have been the oldest. From here, and other ports, a great Mediterranean commercial empire was founded. Homer praised the skill of its craftsmen in producing glass, purple dyes, and its women's skill at the art of embroidery. It was also from here that a colonizing party went to found the city of Tyre. Like other Phoenician city-states, Sidon suffered from a succession of conquerors. At the end of the Persian era in 351 BC, it was invaded by the emperor Artaxerxes III and then by Alexander the Great in 333 BC when the Hellenistic era of Sidon began. Under the successors of Alexander, it enjoyed relative autonomy and organized games and competitions in which the greatest athletes of the region participated. The historical core of Sidon is a Mamluk-era old city that extends between the Sea Castle and the St. Louis Castle. Located on a promontory jutting into the sea, this walled medieval city is very well preserved and is still inhabited today. The old City resembles a vaulted maze with narrow alleyways and winding streets. Arched pathways connect the different neighborhoods of the city. On street level, numerous souvenir shops and mini-markets can be found with old-fashioned bakeries making crunchy whole wheat bread, called "Kaak". A lot of the alleys take the name of their residents' occupations like the "Carpenters' Alley" and the "Tailors' Alley". Several mosques dating back to the Umayyad Era are still preserved and are open to the public. Sidon's Old City is home to many ancient churches and old stone mosques that were built above pagan temples. Sidon was used as the official port of trade by Damascus and Mount Lebanon for the import and export of goods with Egypt and Europe. Sidon's mercantile community was portrayed in its infrastructure: a large number of caravanserais, the biggest of which is "Khan El Franj", old harbors with multiple quays, and the Sidon Sea Castle, a fort that guards the port.
 Tyre, Lebanon has an old town located next to the Roman ruins at the tip of the peninsula. Tyre was originally an island until Alexander the Great built a causeway to seize the city during a fierce battle in the Siege of Tyre. It is home to one of the best preserved Roman Hippodromes in the world among many other ancient ruins. Tyre was one of the most powerful Phoenician cities at a time where it was known for its Tyrian Purple. The city's history also includes goddesses Europa and Dido-Elissa along with many other significant characters.
Rachaya is an old town situated in the Wadi el Taym region in the West Bekaa. The small town is most famous for its Crusader castle, which was later used as a prison in which the founding fathers of the country were imprisoned during their struggle for independence. Traditional brick houses with red-tiled roofs add a wonderful charm to the town.

Museums 

 Beirut National Museum is the principal museum of archaeology in Lebanon. The collection was begun after World War I, and the museum was officially opened in 1942. The museum has collections totaling about 100,000 objects, most of which are antiquities and medieval finds from excavations undertaken by the Directorate General of Antiquities. About 1300 artifacts are exhibited, ranging in date from prehistoric times to the medieval Mamluk period. The museum was designed in a French-inspired Egyptian Revival architecture and built with Lebanese Ochre limestone. It comprises a basement, a ground floor, a mezzanine floor and a terrace; the central block is covered by a glass roof, above the mezzanine, giving natural overhead light. The whole site is approximately 5,500 square meters (59,000 sq ft), and the exhibition floor space totals 6,000 square meters (65,000 sq ft). The immediately adjoining museum annexes and administrative offices occupy about 1,000 square meters (11,000 sq ft). The museum displays follow a chronological circuit beginning in Prehistory and ending in the Ottoman era. The circuit begins on the ground floor where 83 large objects are displayed, these include sarcophagi, mosaics statues and reliefs. The upper floor displays 1243 small and medium-sized artifacts arranged by chronological order and by theme in modern showcases with soft lighting and magnifying glasses that emphasize the aesthetic aspect of the artifacts.
 Gibran Museum, formerly the Monastery of Mar Sarkis, is a biographical museum in Bsharri, Lebanon, 120 kilometers from Beirut. It is dedicated to the Lebanese artist, writer and philosopher Khalil Gibran. Founded in 1935, the Gibran Museum possesses 440 original paintings and drawings of Gibran and his tomb. It also includes his furniture and belongings from his studio when he lived in New York City and his private manuscripts. The building which houses the museum and his tomb was bought by his sister in 1931 under Gibran's request, having spiritual significance as a monastery dating back to the 7th century when it was the Mar Sarkis (Saint Serge) hermitage. In 1975, the Gibran National Committee restored and expanded the monastery to house more exhibits and again expanded it in 1995.
 Archaeological Museum of the American University of Beirut is the third oldest museum in the Near East, after Cairo and Istanbul. The AUB Museum exhibits Levantine artifacts from the Early Stone Age to the Islamic period. The museum was formed in 1868 after Luigi Palma di Cesnola gifted a collection of Cypriot pottery to the newly formed American University of Beirut. Between 1902 and 1938 the Museum acquired collections from all around the Middle East. The museum remained closed during World War II and re-opened in 1948. It expanded in the 1950s and doubled its floor space with a refurbishment under curator Dimitri Baramki which opened to the public in 1964. The collections are organized by chronology and themes with displays along the sides of the gallery displaying the evolution of pottery. Other displays include The Cesnola Collection; the museums first showing pottery from Cyprus from the Bronze Age to the Roman era. The Pre-Historic collection includes Paleolithic and Neolithic eras. The Ksar Akil collection was donated from the University of Boston team who excavated this archaeological site in 1948. The display shows a 23 m stratigraphic sequence of thirty-seven layers illustrated by the flint tools belonging to several cultures detected.
 Sursock Museum is a museum of modern art in the Achrafieh district of Beirut, Lebanon. It belonged to Nicolas Sursock who bequeathed his villa to the city of Beirut after his death in 1961. The museum is an 18th-century mansion built with strong Venetian and Ottoman architectural influences. It is located on Rue Sursock east of the Beirut Central District. The museum collection consists of 5,000 pieces, such as paintings, sculpture, ceramics, glassware, and iconography, dating from the 18th, 19th, and 20th centuries. Some of the local and international artists whose work are in the Museum's permanent collection are Chafic Abboud, Rafic Charaf, Omar Onsi, and Aref Rayess, among many others. The museum is currently undergoing an expansion project that would increase the museum's surface from 2,000 square meters to 7,000 square meters, and include additional exhibition rooms, a library, a bookshop, and music room.
The Robert Mouawad Private Museum is a private residence in Beirut's Zokak el-Blat quarter that was turned into a museum by the Lebanese businessman Robert Mouawad. The palace was built in the neo-gothic style by the Lebanese politician and art collector Henri Philippe Pharaoun in 1911. The museum was inaugurated on May 11, 2006. It houses objects of value reflecting a mix of artistic oriental and occidental cultures, and a rare collection of books, Chinese porcelain, ceramics, and other significant objects. The palace's architecture and design reflect Pharaoh's infatuation with Islamic Art and decorative wooden panels that date back to the 19th century, especially after his repetitive travels to Syria. Other displayed artifacts include Byzantine mosaics, Roman marble sculptures, jars and jugs, historical columns, pottery, ancient weapons, unique carpets, sophisticated jewelry pieces, rare precious stones, Melkite Catholic icons, and preserved manuscripts.
 The Museum of Lebanese Prehistory is the first museum of prehistory in the Arabic Middle East and was opened in June 2000 to commemorate the 125th anniversary of Saint Joseph University of Beirut. The founding of the museum followed from the work of Jesuit scholars who controlled prehistoric research in this part of the world until the 1950s. These had accumulated a large amount of artifacts and heritage, collected at the "Faculté des Lettres et des Sciences Humaines" of Saint Joseph University. This faculty established a research center in 1988 that developed with the creation of the Museum of Prehistory in June 2000. The museum houses an exceptional collection of animal and human bones, Neolithic pottery, stone tools and other ancient items recovered from over four hundred archaeological sites since the 19th century. The collections form a unique reference and were only accessible to specialists until the late 1990s. By exhibiting part of the collection to the public, the University has enabled people to investigate and discover the details and mysteries of prehistoric Lebanon. The museum occupies a total of 350 square meters (3,800 sq ft) on two levels.
Saint George Greek Orthodox Cathedral museum is a crypt museum at the St. Georges Greek Orthodox Cathedral on Nejme Square. It is a relatively small museum that reveals layers of Christian heritage belonging to a series of seven churches built on the same exact site starting 2000 years ago. The current cathedral stands on layers of relics where at every stage of its existence its people attempted to enlarge and beautify it, adding more murals and icons. The museum is a crypt underneath the cathedral where oil lamps, pipes, clay and terracotta pots, miniature statues, and crosses found in various digs are displayed. Glass panels cover some of the crypt's relics and a glass partition separates the crypt from the church's altar directly above it. A narrow metal walkway leads visitors through the twelve stops of the crypt displaying tombstones, mosaics, burial chambers, engravings on stones and columns, well-preserved skeletons, a covered canal, and part of an ancient paved road. The ruins and findings were excavated by Lebanese archaeologists before the cathedral underwent restoration; they aimed at locating the Byzantine church Anastasis, which according to ancient texts is believed to be near Beirut's famous law school before it was leveled by the 551 Beirut earthquake.

Other major museums:

 Ameen Rihani Museum
 M. Farroukh Museum
 Museum and Library of the Catholicosate of Cilicia
 Baalbek Museum
 Dahesh Museum of Art
 Lebanese Heritage Museum
 Expo Hakel Lebanon
 Robert Mouawad Private Museum Lebanon
 Byblos Fossil Museum
 Byblos Wax Museum
 Memory of Time Museum
 Sidon Soap Museum

Religious Tourism

Located in the heart of two major world religions, Christianity and Islam, Lebanon has an old and rich religious background with diverse traditions. This is evident in the religious and multicultural blend that can be seen till present times and which gives a unique identity to the Lebanese society. Lebanon has been a refuge for persecuted religious groups for thousands of years, thus adding a vast amount of religious heritage to the country in both Christian and Islamic sanctuaries and holy places.

 The town of Harissa, Lebanon hosts the Our Lady of Lebanon, also known as Notre Dame du Liban, Marian shrine and pilgrimage site, honoring the patron saint of Lebanon. The village is located 20 km north of Beirut, and accessible from the coastal city of Jounieh either by road or by a nine-minute journey by a gondola lift, known as the "Téléférique". It attracts both pilgrims and tourists who want to enjoy views of the bay of Jounieh. The pilgrimage site is a huge 15-ton bronze (and painted white) statue of Virgin Mary, known as Our Lady of Lebanon or Notre Dame du Liban, with her arms outstretched. The statue was made at the end of the 19th century and inaugurated in 1908. Inside the statue's base, there is a small chapel. A huge modernistic Maronite cathedral built of concrete and glass stands right beside the statue.  It was made up of seven sections that were assembled on top of the stone base, which had a bottom perimeter of 64m, an upper perimeter of 12m and with an overall height of 20m. The height of the statue is 8.50m while its perimeter is 5.50m. The statue and the shrine were inaugurated in 1908, and since then it has been a major pilgrimage destination in Lebanon. The shrine is erected on top of a 650 meters high wooded hill, equipped with a wide observation deck. The shrine was visited by Pope John Paul II in 1997 and Pope Benedict XVI in 2012.
Our Lady of Mantara in Maghdouché, Lebanon, also known in English as Our Lady of Awaiting, is a holy Christian site and a Marian shrine. The shrine consists of a tower crowned with the statue of the Virgin and Child, a cathedral, a cemetery and a sacred cave believed to be the one where the Virgin Mary rested while she waited for Jesus. Ever since the rediscovery, the cave of Our Lady of Mantara has been open to the public. It has become a major pilgrimage site in the Lebanon. The adjacent hilltop where Jesus and Mary had once stood is now Sidon's Greek Catholic cemetery. Grand festivities are held each year on September 8 to commemorate the rediscovery of the sacred cave. Near the sacred cave, the people of Magdhdouché built a cathedral and a modern tower crowned with a bronze statue of the Virgin and Child. The tower offers pilgrims panoramic views of Sidon, the Mediterranean, and the lush hills, valleys and citrus groves of South Lebanon.
Our Lady of Bekaa (also spelled Beqaa), is a Marian shrine located in the city of Zahlé in the Beqaa Valley. In 1958, Bishop Euthym, a man of great devotion to Our Lady, decided to build a shrine in honor of the Virgin Mary on the top of a hill overlooking Zahle and the Bekaa Valley. A ten-meter-high bronze statue of the Virgin Mary, the work of the Italian artist, Pierroti, rests on a 54-meter high tower, crowning a hill known by the name of Tel Chiha. An elevator takes pilgrims and tourists up to a viewing platform overlooking the red-roofed city and offering panoramic views of the valley. The base of the tower houses a small chapel that seats about 100 people.
 Mar Sarkis, Ehden is a monastery located in the Zgharta District in the North Governorate of Lebanon. It is situated in the Qozhaya valley, the northern branch of the valley of Qadisha, to the east of Ehden. It overlooks Ehden, Kfarsghab, Bane and Hadath El Jebbeh. Given its exceptional location commanding the valley at 1500 meters altitude, the monastery is called the Watchful Eye of Qadisha. It is dedicated to Saints Sarkis and Bakhos (Saints Sergius and Bacchus). The name Ras Al Nahr means the top of the river as it is in the vicinity of the Mar Sarkis Source, the main contributor to the river Qlaynsieh which, after joining the Qannoubine river, will form near Tripoli the river Abou Ali. The Monastery belongs to the Lebanese Antonin Maronite Order, a Monastic Order founded on August 15, 1700, by the Maronite Patriarch Gabriel Al Blouzani from Blaouza (1704-1705). The first church of Saints Sarkis and Bakhos was built in the mid 8th Century A.D. on the ruins of a Canaanite temple dedicated to a divinity of agriculture. Next to it, another church dedicated to Our Lady was constructed in 1198 A.D.. Several buildings were added from 1404 up until 1690 when Patriarch Estephan El Douaihy restored part of the buildings.
 Monastery of Qozhaya, also transliterated Qazahya is located in the Zgharta District in the North Governorate of Lebanon. It belongs to the Lebanese Maronite Order, known as Baladites. It is dedicated to Saint Anthony the Great. It is commonly called Qozhaya, in reference to the valley in which it is located. The valley of Qozhaya, along with the valley of Qannoubine to which it is connected to the west, form what is called the valley of Qadisha. Qozhaya is considered to be one of the oldest monasteries of the valley of Qadisha. Several hermitages are attached to it and at a certain period (probably the 12th Century AD), it has been the See of the Maronite Patriarch. In 1584, the first printing press of the Middle East was installed in this monastery. In 1708, it was handed down to the newly formed Lebanese Maronite Order. It still belongs to this important Order. Qozhaya was at its pinnacle in the first part of the 19th Century with more than 300 monks belonging to it. With its large properties in the valley, in Ain-Baqra and in Jedaydeh, Qozhaya is one of the richest monasteries of the Order. It contributes financially to the maintenance of the less fortunate monasteries of the Order.
 Our Lady of Bzommar is worshiped at the Monastery of Bzommar, belonging to the Armenian Catholic Church.
 Emir Munzer Mosque This mosque was constructed by Emir Munzer Al-Tannoukhi. The mosque was also known as Masjid Al-Naoufara because of the fountain in its courtyard. The mosque has two entrances: the original 17th century arch portal from Souk Al-Bazarkhan, and a second entrance with three arches, added when the adjacent building was demolished to make way for the new Emir Fakhreddine Street (later renamed Riad Al-Solh Street).
 Emir Assaf Mosque Emir Assaf Mosque is located in downtown Beirut, Emir Mansur Assaf inaugurated the mosque in 1597, on the former Serail Square that hosted Emir Fakhreddine's palace. 
 Mansouri Great Mosque The Mansouri Great Mosque is a mosque in Tripoli, Lebanon, also known simply as The Great Mosque of Tripoli. It was built in the Mamluk period, from 1294 to 1314, around the remains of a Crusader Church of St. Mary.
 Al-Nabi Shayth A mosque was built on the burial site and it contains the grave of Seth, son of Adam inside the mosque. 
 Shrine of Sayyida Khawla bint al-Hussain The shrine of Sayyida Khawla, the daughter of Imam Hussein and great granddaughter of Prophet Muhammad, is a religious tourist attraction, began as a tomb of Sayyida Khawla at the year 680 CE that later had a mosque reconstructed over at the year 1656 CE. There exists inside the mosque a tree that is said to have been planted by Ali ibn Husayn Zayn al-Abidin and it is 1,300 years old. It is the most known Islamic shrine in Lebanon, for its Islamic architecture and its holiness especially for Shi'as there.
 Shrine of Prophet Elias Is a shrine located at the village of Nabi Ayla in Beqaa. It is said to belong to a prophet called Ayla, or Elias, who was sent to the people of Baalbek. Built at around the 17th century.
 Shrine of Prophet Noah Is a shrine located in a village called Karak Noah, and there exists a tomb that is referred to Noah, and it is said to have been verified as the place of his burial by multiple witnesses, at the 12th century.
 The mosque of Ibrahim al-Khalil Is a mosque built by the Muslims when first entered Lebanon. It was built at year 635 CE and it is located in the city of Baalbek. 
 Ra's el-Ain Mosque Is Known by the name of “Masjid el-Hussein”, this mosque was built in 61AH/681AC above the ruins of an old Phoenician temple, near the spring of Ra's el-Ain. The stones of the temple were used in building the mosque. Later, the Mamluk sultan el-Zaher Baybars renewed and enlarged it in 676AH/1277AC.

Anjar

Inscribed as a world heritage site in 1984, Anjar was a commercial center for Levantine trade routes. Being only 1,300 years old, Anjar is one of Lebanon's newer archaeological sites. It was founded by the Umayyad Caliph Al-Walid ibn Abdel Malek (in the beginning of the 8th century) and takes its name from the Arabic Ain Gerrah meaning "the source of Gerrah", related to the Umayyad stronghold founded in the same era.
The city's wide avenues are lined with mosques, palaces, baths, storehouses, and residences. The city ruins cover 114,000 square meters and are surrounded by large, fortified stone walls, over two meters thick and seven meters high. The rectangular city design is based on Roman city planning and architecture, with stonework and other features borrowed from the Byzantines. Two large avenues – the 20-meter-wide Cardo Maximus, running north to south, and the Decumanus Maximus, running east to west – divide the city into four quadrants. At the crossroads in the center of the city, four great tetrapylons mark the four corners of the intersection.

Baalbeck
During the Phoenician era, Baalbek was a small village. Little remains of the Phoenician structures of the city, which was later named Heliopolis under the Hellenistic rule and extensively rebuilt by the Romans. After the arrival of the Romans to Phoenicia in 64 B.C., the city was transformed to a celebrated sanctuary where  (Jupiter, Venus, and Mercury) and it was overlaid during a period of two centuries by a series of colossal temples. Modern-day visitors to Baalbek can enter the site through the grand Roman propylaea and walk through the two large colonnaded courtyards to reach the complex's great temples:

 The Temple of Jupiter was the largest Roman temple ever constructed. Today, just six of the original 54 Corinthian columns remain standing. Each column is 22 meters (66 ft) high and 2 meters (7.5 ft) in diameter, hinting at the temple's enormous size in the time of the Roman Empire.
 The Temple of Bacchus is the best-preserved Roman temple in the Middle East. Although smaller than the Temple of Jupiter, the Temple of Bacchus is still larger than the Parthenon in Athens. The dedication and purpose of this temple, and its relationship to the rest of the temple complex, remain a mystery.
 The Temple of Venus is a smaller, domed structure set apart to the southeast of the complex. During the Byzantine period, the temple was converted into a church honoring Saint Barbara.
 Only part of the staircase from the Temple of Mercury can still be seen on Sheikh Abdallah hill, a short distance away from the main temple site.
Baalbek was inscribed as a world heritage site in 1984.

Byblos
Byblos was inscribed as a world heritage site in 1984. Inhabited since the Neolithic age, it witnessed the arrival of successive civilizations, from Phoenicians and Crusaders to Ottoman Turks. Byblos is a historical Mediterranean region dating back thousands of years and closely associated with the spread of the Phoenician alphabet.

The main touristic sites in Byblos:
 Ancient Phoenician Temples, that include the Temple of the Obelisks (also known as the Great Temple or L-Shaped temple), and the Temple of Baalat Gebal.
 Byblos Castle, a 12th-century Crusader castle located near the port.
 Byblos Mosque, considered to be the oldest mosque in the world.
 Medieval City Wall
 Byblos Wax Museum
 St John the Baptist Church, a Crusader church built in 1150.
 Byblos Fossil Museum
 Historic Quarter and Souks, near the entrance of the archaeological site.

Qadisha Valley and Cedars Forest
Inscribed as a world heritage site in 1998, the Qadisha Valley and Cedars Forest (also known as the Forest of the Cedars of God) are considered to be of significant importance. The Qadisha valley was a settlement of early Christian monasticism, situated in a rugged landscape north of the Western Mountain Range of Lebanon. Near the valley lies the Cedars forest, a nature reserve dedicated to the preservation of the last Cedar trees, used in antiquity for the construction of Phoenician boats and religious buildings.

List of monasteries in the Qadisha Valley:
 The Qannubin Monastery, the oldest of the Maronite monasteries in the valley.
 The Monastery of St Anthony of Qozhaya, traditionally founded in the 4th century by St Hilarion.
 The Monastery of Our Lady of Hawqa, founded in the late 13th century by villagers from Hawqa.
 The Monastery of Mar Sarkis, Ehden, successively built in the 8th century, 1198 and 1690.
 The Monastery of Mar Lishaa, comprising a Maronite solitary order and a Barefoot Carmelite order.

Other monasteries consist of the Monastery of Mar Girgis, with the Chapel of Mar Challita, the Monastery of Mar Yuhanna, the Monastery of Mar Abun, with the Hermitage of Mar Sarkis, and the Monastery of Mart Moura, Ehden.

Tyre
Tyre was inscribed as a world heritage site in 1984. It was the birthplace of the purple dye known as Tyrian purple and had founded several colonies in the Mediterranean such as Carthage and Cadiz. Many civilizations successively settled in Tyre from Phoenicians, Greeks, and Romans to Crusaders and Ottoman Turks. Today, there are still many valuable remains mainly from the Roman era.

Major archaeological sites in Tyre:
 Al-Bass site, having a three-bay monumental arch, an extensive necropolis and a large hippodrome (all dating from the 2nd century AD to the 6th century AD).
 City site, in the old Phoenician island city, it consists of colonnades, public baths, mosaics, streets, a vast district of civic buildings and a rectangular arena.

Ecotourism

Ecotourism in Lebanon has a rich background of natural diversity and a wide range of outdoor activities. With an original landscape consisting of mountains, forests, wildlife, beaches, snow-fed rivers, caves, valleys, and gorges, Lebanon is becoming more of an outdoor destination where people can visit its natural reserves and practice their ecotourism activities.

Ecotourism activities and sports:
 ATV (All-terrain vehicle)
 Rafting
 Hiking
 Caving
 Dirt biking
 Via Ferrata
 Rappelling
 Horse riding
 Snowboarding
 Mountain biking
 Mountain climbing

Natural reserves:
 Al Shouf Cedar Nature Reserve
 Horsh Ehden Nature Reserve
 La Reserve Afqa
 Palm Islands Nature Reserve
 Tannourine Nature Reserve
 Tyre Beach Nature Reserve
 Yammouneh Nature Reserve

Lebanese outdoors
Lebanon's nature and geography, which are unique to the Middle East region, allow the practice of outdoor activities (mainly concentrated in the summer season). Nowadays, these activities are gaining more interest from nature lovers and becoming well equipped with the specific requirements and facilities.

Major Outdoor activities:
 Camping, a popular outdoor activity concentrated between the months of May and September.
 Caving, an important Lebanese natural heritage (3 of the major caves are Afqa Grotto, Roueiss, and Ain El Libne).
 Cycling, a notable activity of recent interest.
 Hiking, an activity with a high number of trails (some of the hiking locations are Al Shouf Cedar Nature Reserve, Ramlieh, Qammouah, the Horsh Ehden reserve and Nahr Ibrahim).
 Paragliding, one of the best glide ports in the Middle East (the paragliding locations are The Cedars, Ehden, Lassa, Miziara, Harissa, Barouk and Faraya).
 Rafting, a recently introduced sport practiced in locations like the Assi, the Litani, and the Awali rivers.
Motorcycle riding, different motorcycle clubs organize all year round rides throughout the country. A notable reference is H.O.G Lebanon Chapter which includes more than 300 members.

Winter Sports

Although Lebanon is considered to be a summer destination, winter sports are becoming more in demand due to the close geographical location of the mountain peaks from the Mediterranean sea and the unique winter experience that visitors have. Lebanese winter sports include Alpine skiing and Cross Country in addition to paragliding, snowmobiling, and hiking.

The Ski resorts:	
 The Cedars, 1850–3087 m above sea level and 120 km from Beirut.
 Laqlouq, 1750-2200m above sea level and 60 km from Beirut.
 Faqra-Kfardebian, 1800–2400 m above sea level and 45 km from Beirut.
 Mzaar-Kfardebian, 1850–2500 m above sea level and 45 km from Beirut.
 Qanat Bakiche, 1900 m above sea level and 60 km from Beirut.
 Zaarour, 1700–2000 m above sea level and 40 km from Beirut.

Leisure

Lebanon has a 200 km of seashore with about 300 days of sunshine a year, making it a favorable destination for leisure and activities that expand in different parts of the country.

Popular Beaches and water parks in Lebanon: 
 Orchid Beach Resort
 Turquoise Beach Resort
 Oceana Beach Resort
 Edde Sands
 Laguava Resort
 Cyan
 Janna Sur Mer
 Green Beach
 Riviera Beach Club
 Bamboo Bay
 Waves Aquapark
 Watergate Aquapark
 Jiyeh Marina

Art Galleries in Lebanon:

 Zamaan Gallery - includes a collection of more than 1700 paintings by Lebanese and Middle Eastern artists (www.zamaangallery.com)
 Lebanon is famous for its lottery system and Loto, operated by La Libanaise Des Jeux Official La Libanaise des Jeux.

Lebanese cuisine

The Lebanese cuisine, resembling Levantine cuisine with its own unique distinctions, combines the exotic ingredients of the Middle and Far East with the sophistication of European cuisine. Although the Lebanese cuisine has a recent popularity throughout the world, its history dates back to pre-biblical times. This eastern Mediterranean cuisine, which is located in a relatively small geographical area, has had a major influence on Middle Eastern cuisine and other neighboring culinary cultures. Nowadays, Lebanese cuisine is known throughout the world, especially with the recent emphasis on the health benefits of Mediterranean cuisine. The significant importance of this ancient cuisine has also inspired professional chefs and restaurateurs across the country to feature exciting Lebanese items on their menus.
Popular Lebanese Restaurants in Lebanon:
Mounir, Karamna, Leila, Al Balad, Kababji, and Al Halabi

Lebanese crafts
Lebanese crafts have a sense of style and beauty that attract many tourists interested in these unique handcrafted items which are considered as a significant souvenir of the tour. The production method of Lebanese crafts is mainly concentrated in small villages where the old skills are handed from generation to generation, produced from local raw materials and carefully made with a sophisticated aesthetic and skill. Different regions of the country specialize in various handicrafts such as basketry, carpet weaving, ceramics and pottery, copper and metalworking, embroidery, glass blowing, and gold and silver smithing. Some Lebanese villages are also known for their finely crafted church bells.

Popular tourist destinations in Lebanon 

 Sidon a 6,000-year-old city on the southern coast of Lebanon. This city is an up-and-coming tourist destination boasting several attractions like the Sidon Soap Museum, Sidon Sea Castle, Old City, Our Lady of Mantara, Eshmun Temple...etc.
 Mzaar Kfardebian a prominent Lebanese ski area and mountain resort.
 Beirut the capital city which features thriving nightlife, fantastic restaurants, and the famous Raouche Rock
 Harissa where visitors can take the Téléférique up Mount Harissa to visit Our Lady of Lebanon.
 Jeita Grotto recognized as one of the most magnificent limestone caves in the world.
 Beiteddine a small city in Chouf which hosts the Beiteddine Palace and the Beiteddine Festival.
 Batroun a small city in north Lebanon which has the famous Mousaylaha citadel built by the Crusaders. Batroun is also famous for its Phoenician old town and old churches. Nightlife is thriving in Batroun with many nightclubs and beach bars. Colonel Beer Brewery, one of a kind in the region, is also located on the shores of Batroun.
 Tripoli, Lebanon the second largest city which has seen many empires, with a famous souk, the 5,000-year-old Tripoli Castle, and one of the oldest ports in the world in its neighboring city El Mina.
 The Beirut Central District used to be the beating heart of the city but is hardly gaining its old status. Home to numerous historical sites, and rebuilt after the end of the civil war, the BCD it hosts a number of upscale hotels, restaurants, and shops. It is by far the most visited tourist venue in Lebanon. During the summer, the squares and parks of the BCD turn into huge open-air concert halls boasting regional and international performance, but generally speaking, after office hours, the district streets are empty.
 The trendy and lively neighbourhoods are Badaro with its village feel and its animated bars and cafes scene, Hamra, Gemmayzeh and Mar Mikhaël.
 Byblos, believed to be one of the oldest continuously inhabited cities in the world, is also a big tourist destination known for its ruins and ancient citadels, its old souk and port, its beaches, its museums, and more recently its nightlife. Byblos also hosts Byblos International Festival yearly, the biggest festival in Lebanon with worldwide artists performing concerts on the seaside near the sea castle. It was voted the best Arab city in 2015.
 Ehden, a mountain town located in the North Governorate, at an altitude of 1450 meters, Ehden is a popular tourist destination mostly visited by Lebanese tourists that come from all over Lebanon. Ehden offers plenty of historical and religious landmarks, it is home to the first Maronite church in Lebanon. Ehden is also home to one of the biggest nature reserves in Lebanon, the Horsh Ehden reserve which offers a wide variety of fauna and flora, it is also a hiking destination. Ehden has a town centre that offers plenty of international cuisine restaurants as well as traditional cuisine. Ehden hosts an international festival every year named "Ehdeniyat International Festival". It is advisable to visit the town in summer as it is a summer town for the people of Zgharta therefore it is empty in winter and spring, nevertheless, the Horsh Ehden reserve is open all year long with all hotels being opened all year long as well.

Lebanese festivals

There is a wide range of festivals that take place in Lebanon, especially in the summer season where festivities including both Lebanese and international performers take place in major archaeological and historical sites, including Baalbek, Byblos, and Beiteddine.

Major Lebanese festivals:
 Anjar Festival
 Al Bustan Festival
 Baalbeck International Festival
 Beiteddine Festival
 Byblos International Festival
 Deir el Qamar Festival
 Tyre Festival

Statistics and economy

Tourism was once a very important contributor to Lebanon's economy, accounting for almost 20 percent of the GDP in the 2 decades before the start of the civil war. Since the end of the war, the sector has managed to revive somewhat, but tourism has yet to return to its pre-war levels. Tourism in 1999 accounted for 9 percent of the GDP. In 2001, the tourism sector was one of the fastest growing sectors of the economy, with the number of tourists visiting Lebanon between 1996 and 2000 growing at the rate of 14 percent annually. In 2003 the tourism industry contributed 6.374 billion U.S. dollars to the Lebanese economy and in 2005 the receipts per capita reached 1,433 U.S. dollars. In 2004, the song "Libnan", written and performed by Lydia Canaan (who in 1997 was awarded the Lebanese International Success Award by the Lebanese Ministry of Tourism), was the soundtrack of the advertisement "Rediscover Lebanon", produced and broadcast by CNN to over one-billion viewers and commissioned by the Lebanese Ministry of Economy & Trade to promote Lebanon as a tourist destination.
In 2006 the ministry of Tourism counted 373,037 admissions to the country's main ministry run touristic sites. In 2009, Lebanon hosted about two million tourists, a record number, passing the previous 1974 record of 1.4 million tourists. The number of tourists grew by 39% over the previous year, the largest increase in any country according to the World Tourism Organization. Most of the increase is due to heightened political stability and security. Lebanon was also featured by several international media outlets, including the New York Times, CNN, and  Paris Match, as a top tourist destination at the beginning of 2009. Lebanon's annual income from tourism reached $7 billion, about 20 percent of its gross domestic product, according to the Minister of Tourism.  Despite the recent surge in popularity as a tourist destination, the United States along with a number of other countries continue to urge their citizens to avoid all travel to Lebanon due to current safety and security concerns.

Recent years

On August 16, 2015, during the 7th session of the Joint Jordanian-Lebanese Higher Committee, Lebanese and Jordanian officials signed a five-year tourism partnership program which includes efforts to promote tourism in both countries.

Arrivals by country
Most visitors arriving to Lebanon were from the following countries of nationality:

Bibliography
Dewailly B., 2007, « Du cas et des “K” touristiques libanais : une communication géographique » , in Villes et Territoires du Moyen-Orient, Institut Français du Proche-Orient, Beyrouth, mars, n° 3, on Hal-SHS.
Dewailly B. et Ovazza J.-M., 2009, "Le tourisme au Liban : quand l’action ne fait plus système", in Berriane M. (Ed.), Tourisme des nationaux, tourisme des étrangers : quelles articulations en Méditerranée ?, Rabat University Press, Faculté des Lettres et des Sciences Humaines and European Research Institute, Florence, Italy, 277 p.  - PDF preprint version 2004 on Hal-SHS.
Dewailly B. et Ovazza J.-M., 2009, " Les complexes balnéaires privés au Liban. Quels lieux touristiques en émergence ?", in Berriane M. (Ed.), Tourisme des nationaux, tourisme des étrangers : quelles articulations en Méditerranée ?, Rabat University Press, Faculté des Lettres et des Sciences Humaines and European Research Institute, Florence, Italy, 277 p.  - PDF preprint version 2004 on Hal-SHS.
Ministère libanais du tourisme, 1995, Le Liban – Un Avenir – Le Tourisme, Plan de Reconstruction et de Développement Touristiques du Liban, République Libanaise, Organisation Mondiale du Tourisme, République Française, Programme des Nations-Unies pour le Développement.

See also

Constitution of Lebanon
Driving licence in Lebanon
Foreign relations of Lebanon
History of Lebanon
Lebanese diaspora
Lebanese identity card
Lebanese passport
Politics of Lebanon
Vehicle registration plates of Lebanon
Visa policy of Lebanon
Visa requirements for Lebanese citizens

References

External links 

 Ecotourism in Lebanon

 
Lebanon
Economy of Lebanon
 01